Timișoara Utility Airport is an airport located in the northwestern part of Timișoara. It is also known as Cioca Airfield or, sometimes, Timișoara West Airfield. It is used by owners of small- and medium-sized aircraft for recreational flying, by air taxi companies, as well as by utility aircraft spraying fields with fertilizers and insecticides. Cioca Airfield was for a short time the main airport of Timișoara.

The airfield was built in the interwar period, in 1936, as the civil airport of Timișoara. During World War II, between 1941–1944, the Cioca Airfield was used by the German aviation Luftwaffe, during the communism by Aviasan, and today is the property of the Timiș County Council.

References 

Airports in Romania